This is a list of events and openings related to amusement parks that occurred in 2015. These various lists are not exhaustive.

Amusement parks

Opening
 Vietnam Asia Park
 Morocco Parc Sindibad
   USA   HuckFinn PlayLand

Birthday
 

Australia Luna Park Sydney – 80th birthday
England Alton Towers Resort – 35th birthday
England Drayton Manor Theme Park – 65th birthday
Germany Europa Park – 40th birthday
 Hong Kong, China Hong Kong Disneyland – 10th birthday
 Italy Gardaland Resort – 40th birthday
 Philippines Enchanted Kingdom – 20th birthday
 USA Disneyland – 60th birthday
 USA Universal Orlando – 25th birthday
 USA  Universal Studios Hollywood – 50th birthday
 USA Six Flags New England – 145th birthday
 USA Sesame Place – 35th birthday
 USA Elitch Gardens – 125th birthday
 USA Kings Dominion – 40th birthday
 USA Knott's Berry Farm – 75th birthday

Closed
 USA  Boomers! Dania Beach – January 25
 Finland Wasalandia – 2015
 USA  Miracle Strip at Pier Park – September 21

Additions

Roller coasters

New

Relocated

Refurbished

Other attractions

New

Closed attractions & roller coasters

Themed Accommodation

New

References

Amusement parks by year
Amusement parks